Amritpur is a village and former Village Development Committee (Nepal) that is now part of Tulsipur Sub-Metropolitan City in Dang Deokhuri District in Lumbini Province of south-western Nepal. At the time of the 1991 Nepal census it had a population of 9,680 persons living in 1725 individual households.

References

External links
UN map of the municipalities of Dang Deokhuri District

Populated places in Dang District, Nepal
Towns in Nepal